The Cuban kite (Chondrohierax wilsonii) is a  bird of prey in the family Accipitridae which also includes many other diurnal raptors such as kites, eagles and harriers. It is endemic to Cuba.

This species is classified as critically endangered by BirdLife International and the IUCN. The current population is estimated 50 to 249 mature birds. In the last 40 years the species has only been observed a handful of times with the latest published sighting in 2010 in Alejandro de Humboldt National Park.

The Clements Checklist considered it as subspecies of the hook-billed kite until its 2022 revision. A molecular phylogenetics analysis using mitochondrial DNA suggests that it warrants species status having diverged from the mainland lineage approximately 400,000 to 1.5 million years ago.

Forest destruction and degradation is the leading cause of population decline, as well as the reduction in prey snail numbers and persecution by local farmers. Its apparently tame nature makes it an easy target for shooters.

Description 
The Cuban kite is a little smaller than the hook-billed kite. Males have gray upperparts, black bars on the tail, and the underparts evenly barred grayish and white. Females resemble the Grenada form of hook-billed kite, but the brown barring on the underparts is less rufescent. The bill of Cuban kite is yellowish, in contrast to hook-billed kite's mostly dark bill.

Behavior 
Cuban kite feeds on colored tree snails and slugs, which it finds in the forest undergrowth, for which its deeply hooked bill is thought to be adapted for. Taxonomic uncertainties within the genus Chondrohierax stem from the high degree of variation in bill size and plumage coloration throughout the geographic range of the single recognized species, hook‐billed kite Chondrohierax uncinatus. These uncertainties impede conservation efforts as local populations have declined throughout much of its geographic range from the Neotropics in Central America to northern Argentina and Paraguay, including two island populations on Cuba and Grenada, and it is not known whether barriers to dispersal exist between any of these areas.

References

External links

BirdLife Species Factsheet
BEX recipients photograph a Cuban Kite (Chondroierax wilsonii)
Global Raptor Information Network species account

Cuban kite
Endemic birds of Cuba
Critically endangered fauna of North America
Cuban kite